Mark Twain Tonight! is a one-man play devised by Hal Holbrook, in which he depicted Mark Twain giving a dramatic recitation selected from several of Twain's writings, with an emphasis on the comic ones.

Background
The recitation's genesis was a show that Holbrook performed with his then-wife Ruby in which she would interview him portraying famous people in history, including Twain. Holbrook revised the concept into a one-man show in the 1950s, first performing it at the Lock Haven State Teachers College in Pennsylvania in 1954. He made his first New York City appearance as Twain in the Off-Broadway engagement in 1959 and premiered it on Broadway in 1966. Holbrook's performance was first noticed by New York producer John Lotas at The Lambs Club in Manhattan. Lotas presented the show at the Forty-First Street Theatre, where it ran for 174 performances. He won a Tony Award for Best Performance by a Leading Actor in a Play for that appearance and an Emmy Award nomination for the 1967 television broadcast (which was produced by David Susskind) on CBS. Holbrook released three Mark Twain Tonight! albums between 1959 and 1967.

The last performance on Broadway was in 2006. Holbrook was known to alternate the material that he performed. The original program from the 1959 Off-Broadway engagement included the note, "While Mr. Twain’s selections will come from the list below, we have been unable to pin him down as to which of them he will do. He claims this would cripple his inspiration. However, he has generously conceded to a printed program for those who are in distress and wish to fan themselves." This appeared on programs for the show until Holbrook abruptly announced his retirement from the show in September 2017. 

At the time of his retirement, Holbrook noted that he had been performing under the name "Mark Twain" 13 years longer than its originator: Samuel Clemens had adopted the pseudonym at age 24 and died at the age of 74.

The performance

In an interview with William Goldman, Holbrook explained how he structured the show. "Who wants to see an evening about a literary figure? I knew that in the first act I had to overcome that natural reluctance, so my biggest desire was to make them laugh their asses off at the start, so they'd go out at intermission and say, 'Hey, this guy's funny.' The second act became the social-comment act. I'd start with some funny material to get them again (but not too much of it, or they'd never stop laughing and take the show right away from you). In the last act I gave them the Twain they'd been expecting all along: warm, whimsical, memories of childhood."

Holbrook adapted to concerns that presenting Mark Twain as on an 1890s lecture circuit would use racial slurs acceptable in that era, but unacceptable to modern audiences.  Challenging the critics, Holbrook often chose to read a passage from "Huckleberry Finn" where the orphaned, pipe-smoking, uneducated youngster, Huck, faces a poignant moral dilemma. Holbrook altered the narration to use the dialectally milder "Nigra" as the young boy wrestles with his conscience over following the law or his heart concerning "the widow's Nigra, Jim," a runaway slave. Audiences have embraced this presentation as the boy ultimately rejects the legal, societal and even religious ramifications in favor of helping the runaway on his quest for freedom. It is one of the more somber segments of a usually humorous presentation, which Holbrook has felt important to continue in the spirit of Twain's own message.

Specials
On the occasion of Clemens' 175th birthday (November 30, 2010), Holbrook performed Mark Twain Tonight! in Elmira, New York, at the Clemens Center in front of a sell-out crowd. April 21, 2010 was the 100th anniversary of his death. The evening began with the singing of happy birthday to Clemens followed by Holbrook's appearance on stage. 2014 marked the 60th consecutive year that Holbrook had performed Mark Twain Tonight!

See also 
Mark Twain in popular culture
Mark Twain Live!, a similar long-running show by Mike Randall, whom Holbrook sued in the 1970s

References

External links
 
 

Plays by Hal Holbrook
1954 plays
Plays for one performer
Monodrama
Biographical plays about writers
Plays based on real people
Works about Mark Twain
Cultural depictions of Mark Twain